You've Got Mail is a 1998 American romantic comedy film directed by Nora Ephron and starring Tom Hanks and Meg Ryan. Inspired by the 1937 Hungarian play Parfumerie by Miklós László (which had earlier been adapted in 1940 as The Shop Around the Corner and in 1949 as In the Good Old Summertime), it was co-written by Nora and Delia Ephron. It tells the story of two people in an online romance who are unaware they are also business rivals. It marked the third pairing of Hanks and Ryan, who previously appeared together in Joe Versus the Volcano (1990) and Sleepless in Seattle (1993), the latter directed by Ephron. The film takes its name from the greeting AOL users receive when they get new e-mail.

Plot
Kathleen Kelly is in a relationship with Frank Navasky, a left-leaning newspaper writer for The New York Observer who is always in search of an opportunity to root for the underdog. While Frank is devoted to his typewriter, Kathleen prefers her laptop and logging into her AOL email account. Using the screen name "Shopgirl", she reads an email from "NY152", the screen name of Joe Fox, whom she first met in an "over-30s" chatroom. As her voice narrates her reading of the email, she reveals the boundaries of the online relationship: no specifics, including no names, career or class information, or family connections. She only knows he has a dog named Brinkley.

Joe belongs to the Fox family that runs Fox Books, a chain of mega bookstores. Kathleen runs the independent bookstore The Shop Around The Corner that she inherited from her mom. The two are shown passing each other on their respective ways to work, revealing that they frequent the same neighborhoods on the Upper West Side of Manhattan. Joe arrives at work, overseeing the opening of a new Fox Books in New York City with the help of his best friend, branch manager Kevin. Kathleen and her three store assistants, George, Aunt Birdie, and Christina, open up her small shop that morning.

Following a day with his 11-year-old aunt Annabel and 4-year-old half-brother Matthew, Joe enters Kathleen's store to let his younger relatives experience storytime. Joe and Kathleen have a pleasant conversation that reveals Kathleen's fears about the Fox Books store opening around the corner. He omits his last name and makes an abrupt exit with the children. At a publishing party for New York book business people later that week, Joe and Kathleen meet again where Kathleen discovers Joe's true identity in the Fox family. She accuses him of deception and spying, while he responds by belittling her store.

When "Shopgirl" and "NY152" finally decide to meet, Joe discovers with whom he has been corresponding. At the table, he joins her without revealing his online identity, leading them to clash once more. When Kathleen writes him asking him why he didn't appear, adding that she had a terrible encounter with an awful person, Joe apologizes eloquently for standing her up, and tells her that whatever she said to the awful person she met was probably deserved.

Despite protests against Fox Books and publicity in support of The Shop Around the Corner, sales continue to decline and Kathleen decides to close her store. Her employees move on, including George, who gets a job in the children's department at Fox Books and ensures the staff are knowledgeable. Kathleen and Frank amicably end their relationship when they realize they don't love each other, despite being perfect for each other. Kathleen takes a break to figure out what she wants to do, and her conversations with NY152 inspire her to start writing children's books. After becoming stuck in an elevator with his acerbic girlfriend Patricia and his doorman, who resolves to propose to his girlfriend if they're rescued, Joe ends his relationship and decides to pursue Kathleen. He brings her flowers to apologize for her store closing, and they begin building a friendship, with Joe still keeping his online identity a secret. Kathleen confides in Joe about her online romance.

Eventually, NY152 arranges a meeting between his online persona and Shopgirl, but right before she is to meet her online friend, Joe reveals to Kathleen how he feels, hoping she would choose him over NY152 and forgive him despite their past animosity. Kathleen hints at feeling the same way but cannot bring herself to forego her feelings for NY152, not realizing they are the same man, and the two part. Upon arriving at the meeting place, she hears Joe calling Brinkley and sees that NY152 is, in fact, Joe Fox. Kathleen cries tears of joy and reveals that she hoped it would be him.

Cast

Production

Influences
You've Got Mail is based on the 1937 Hungarian play Parfumerie by Miklós László and its adaptations. Parfumerie was later remade as The Shop Around the Corner, a 1940 film by Ernst Lubitsch, which in 1949 was adapted as a movie musical, In the Good Old Summertime by Robert Z. Leonard starring Judy Garland and Van Johnson and, finally, in 1963 as a Broadway musical with She Loves Me by Jerry Bock and Sheldon Harnick (composer and lyricist, respectively, of Fiddler on the Roof). You've Got Mail updates that concept with the use of e-mail, and the lead character's workplace is named "The Shop Around the Corner" as a nod to the 1940 film. Influences from Jane Austen's Pride and Prejudice can also be seen in the relationship between Joe Fox and Kathleen Kelly—a reference pointed out by these characters actually discussing Mr. Darcy and Elizabeth Bennet in the film. The joke when Tom Hanks explains that the little girl is really his aunt is taken from Israel Zangwill's story "A New Matrimonial Relation" in The Bachelors' Club (1891).

Filming
Principal photography took place primarily in New York City's Upper West Side.

Delia Ephron, recalling the film's bookstore setting, said, "Once we decided that she would be an independent-bookstore owner, the reason we made it a children's bookstore is, I think, we always tried to make movies as personal as we could. To find the thing in it that was personal. And we grew up loving children's books more than anything." Nora Ephron similarly remarked in the film's audio commentary, "This was something that was very important to us—that there be first editions of old children's books. It's part of what make [sic] this a serious bookstore. We wanted to sell the idea that this was a place that really cared about the history of children's literature." Additionally, Ephron had Ryan and Burns rehearse and work in an actual bookstore for a week prior to filming in order to get them into character.

Michael Palin appeared in several scenes that were cut from the film.

Website 
The film's original website remained live until at least May 10, 2018. The website has proven to be fodder for criticism of web design from the 1990s.

Soundtrack

A soundtrack was released on December 1, 1998, and featured a mixture of classics from the 1950s and 1970s, particularly the work of Harry Nilsson, as well as new original recordings and covers. The score to the film was written by the English composer George Fenton.

Reception

Box office
You've Got Mail debuted No. 1 at the North American box office, earning $18.4 million over its opening weekend. It ultimately grossed $115,821,495 from the domestic market and $135,000,000 from other markets for a worldwide total of $250,821,495.

Critical response
On Rotten Tomatoes the film has an approval rating of 70% based on 89 reviews, with an average rating of 6.30/10. The critical consensus reads, "Great chemistry between the leads made this a warm and charming delight." Metacritic gives a weighted average score of 57 out of 100, based on reviews from 19 critics, indicating "mixed or average reviews". Audiences surveyed by CinemaScore gave the film a grade of A− on a scale of A to F.

Roger Ebert of the Chicago Sun-Times gave the film three-out-of-four stars and lauded the "immensely lovable" main characters. Janet Maslin of The New York Times also praised the film, writing of the leads, "Ms. Ryan plays her role blithely and credibly this time, with an air of freshness, a minimum of cute fidgeting and a lot of fond chemistry with Mr. Hanks. And he continues to amaze. Once again, he fully inhabits a new role without any obvious actorly behavior, to the point where comparisons to James Stewart ... really cannot be avoided." Lael Loewenstein of Variety similarly called it a "winning romantic comedy" and praised the chemistry between Hanks and Ryan, writing, "they show why they are two of Hollywood's most bankable and, in many ways, most traditional stars."

Nathan Rabin of The A.V. Club disliked the film, and wrote: "Takes almost two self-infatuated, smarmy, condescending, cringe-inducingly sentimental hours to reach its pre-ordained conclusion" and called the film "almost unwatchably saccharine, representing pretty much everything wrong with today's big-budget, high-concept Hollywood filmmaking." Michael O'Sullivan of The Washington Post criticized the film's use of product placement and its overly "adorable" characters, writing, "For some reason, this film made me feel like a Christmas goose being fattened for slaughter. Its force-fed diet of whimsy cloyed long before the eagerly anticipated romantic payoff arrived to put me out of my misery." Maitland McDonagh also criticized the incongruous product placement "In a film about the ruthless corporate destruction of small businesses, it's hard not to flinch at the prominent placement accorded IBM, Starbucks and AOL logos." Rolling Stone later included You've Got Mail in their list of "Most Egregious Product Placements in Movie & TV History" for the film's frequent use of AOL trademarks (AOL would later merge with film distributor Warner Bros' parent company Time Warner to form AOL Time Warner in 2000).

References

External links

 
 
 
 

1998 films
1998 romantic comedy films
American films based on plays
American romantic comedy films
AOL
Films set in bookstores
1990s English-language films
Films about bibliophilia
Films about online dating
Films based on works by Miklós László
Films directed by Nora Ephron
Films produced by Lauren Shuler Donner
Films scored by George Fenton
Films set in New Jersey
Films set in New York City
Films shot in New Jersey
Films with screenplays by Nora Ephron
Warner Bros. films
1990s American films